Aleksandr Kruzhilov (born 28 December 1980) is a Belarusian gymnast. He competed at the 2000 Summer Olympics.

References

External links
 

1980 births
Living people
Belarusian male artistic gymnasts
Olympic gymnasts of Belarus
Gymnasts at the 2000 Summer Olympics
Sportspeople from Zaporizhzhia